The following is a list of the 27 municipalities (comuni) of the Province of Rimini, Emilia-Romagna, Italy. Before August 2009, seven of these (Casteldelci, Maiolo, Novafeltria, Pennabilli, San Leo, Sant'Agata Feltria and Talamello) were in the Province of Pesaro and Urbino.

List

See also
List of municipalities of Italy

References

Rimini